The Collier-Crichlow House is a historic house in Murfreesboro, Tennessee, U.S..

The house was built circa 1880 for Ingram Banks Collier III, who served as the mayor of Murfreesboro from 1872 to 1873. A relative, Colonel Newton C. Collier, also served as the mayor and as a director of the Nashville, Chattanooga and St. Louis Railway. Two other members of the Collier-Crichlow family served as Murfreesboro's mayor: James H. Crichlow and N. Collier Crichlow.

The house was designed by Confederate veteran and Nashville architect William Crawford Smith in the Second Empire style. It has been listed on the National Register of Historic Places since July 16, 1973.

References

Houses on the National Register of Historic Places in Tennessee
Second Empire architecture in Tennessee
Renaissance Revival architecture in Tennessee
Houses completed in 1880
Buildings and structures in Murfreesboro, Tennessee